Elsie May Deane (born 22 June 1910 in Brighton, Victoria, Australia - died 22 July 1978 in Healesville, Victoria) was an Australian cricket player. Deane played one test for the Australia national women's cricket team. Deane was the 20th woman to play cricket for Australia.

References

Australian women cricketers
1910 births
1978 deaths
Victoria women cricketers
Australia women Test cricketers
People from Brighton, Victoria
Cricketers from Melbourne
Sportswomen from Victoria (Australia)